Symphyotrichum hallii (formerly Aster hallii) is a species of flowering plant in the family Asteraceae endemic to western Oregon and Washington states. Commonly known as Hall's aster, it is a perennial, herbaceous plant with a long rhizome that creates colonies of itself.

It is conservationally Imperiled (S2) in Washington state.

Citations

References

 
 

hallii
Endemic flora of Oregon
Endemic flora of Washington (state)
Plants described in 1884
Taxa named by Asa Gray